The Dorena–Hickman Ferry is a ferry across the Mississippi River between Dorena, Missouri and Hickman, Kentucky. A single boat takes vehicular traffic across the river seven days a week during daylight hours. Missouri Route 77 connects to the Missouri side while Kentucky Route 1354 connects to the Kentucky side.

It provides the only direct road connection between the two states' mainlands; however, they are indirectly connected at Cairo, Illinois via US 60/US 62 over the Cairo Mississippi River Bridge and the Cairo Ohio River Bridge, both just above the mouth of the Ohio River. Nonetheless, since the Ohio is the historic division between the upper & lower parts of the Mississippi, this ferry is the farthest-upstream crossing of the Lower Mississippi; the two Cairo bridges are the farthest-downstream crossings of the Upper Mississippi and the Ohio, respectively.

See also
List of crossings of the Lower Mississippi River

References

External links
Ferry

Ferries of the Mississippi River
Ferries of Kentucky
Water transportation in Missouri
Transportation in Fulton County, Kentucky
Transportation in Mississippi County, Missouri